Holiday Lodge is an American comedy television series created by Seymour Berns. The series stars Johnny Wayne, Frank Shuster, Maureen Arthur, Charles Smith and Justice Watson. The series aired on CBS from June 25, 1961, to September 17, 1961.

Cast 
Johnny Wayne as Johnny Miller 
Frank Shuster as Frank Boone 
Maureen Arthur as Dorothy Jackson 
Charles Smith as Woodrow 
Justice Watson as J.W. Harrington

Episodes

References

External links
 

1960s American comedy television series
1961 American television series debuts
1961 American television series endings
English-language television shows
CBS original programming